Clare Coulter (born 1942) is a Canadian actress. Although she has appeared in film, television and stage roles, she is most highly regarded for her stage work.

Career 
Coulter's noted stage roles have included Eleanor in the original production of George F. Walker's Love and Anger, the first English-language production of Michel Tremblay's Albertine in Five Times, and a 2013 Harbourfront Centre production of King Lear in which she became one of relatively few women to have portrayed the title role.

Coulter is a Genie Award nominee for Best Supporting Actress at the 4th Genie Awards in 1983 for By Design, and a Canadian Screen Award nominee for Best Supporting Actress at the 6th Canadian Screen Awards in 2018 for Cross My Heart (Les Rois mongols). She also appeared in the films The Wars, When Night Is Falling, The Five Senses, Saint Monica, Away from Her and We Are Gold (Nous sommes Gold), and in the television series The Newsroom, The Worst Witch, This Is Wonderland and Living in Your Car.

Filmography

Film

Television

References

External links

1942 births
Canadian television actresses
Canadian film actresses
Canadian stage actresses
Canadian voice actresses
Canadian Shakespearean actresses
Actresses from Toronto
Living people
20th-century Canadian actresses
21st-century Canadian actresses